The Powers Church is a historic church in York Township, Steuben County, Indiana, described as a "fine example of early northern Indiana Colonial Revival architecture".  In 1983, it was added to the National Register of Historic Places, where it is listed as Free Church, a reference to the Church's non-denominational nature.

The church was built between 1875 and 1876 for $1827 on land donated by the Powers family, one of the earliest settlers in the area.  In the 1920s, a dwindling congregation brought an end to the regular services, although the church was still used for funerals and other events until the 1950s, when it was closed.  The building sat unused until 1976, at which time a restoration effort was undertaken.  Restorers found that many of the original furnishings were still serviceable, including the oak and butternut woodwork and pews as well as the carpet.  The steeple was most in need of restoration.

In 1978, the church was again opened to the public, starting an annual tradition of three monthly non-denominational services – June, July, and August – led by area ministers and featuring local musicians, and often followed by an ice cream social.

The building consists of only two rooms: a small anteroom which leads, via two flanking doors, to the much larger sanctuary.  The steeple is accessed via a rough-hewn ladder in the anteroom.  Behind the church, to the east, stands a boulder commemorating the arrival of the Powers settlers in 1837, and beyond that lies the  Powers Cemetery, where the first burials date from 1839, nearly 40 years before the church.

Gallery

References

Evangelical churches in Indiana
Churches on the National Register of Historic Places in Indiana
Italianate architecture in Indiana
Churches completed in 1876
19th-century churches in the United States
Buildings and structures in Steuben County, Indiana
Tourist attractions in Steuben County, Indiana
National Register of Historic Places in Steuben County, Indiana
Italianate church buildings in the United States
Greek Revival church buildings in Indiana